Charles Hinton Russell (December 27, 1903 – September 13, 1989) was an American politician who served as the 20th Governor of Nevada. He was a member of the Republican Party.

Biography
Russell was born on December 27, 1903, in Lovelock, Nevada. He graduated from the University of Nevada in 1926. He taught school in Ruby Valley for one term and then went to Ruth to work for the copper company.  He was the editor of the Ely Record for seventeen years, beginning in 1929.

Political career
Russell was a member of the Nevada state Senate from 1941 to 1946. After that, he was elected as a Republican to the Eightieth Congress, succeeding Democrat Berkeley L. Bunker, who ran unsuccessfully for the U. S. Senate. He was an unsuccessful candidate for reelection in 1948 to the Eighty-first Congress, narrowly losing to Reno City Councilman Walter S. Baring. He was elected Nevada Governor in 1951 and signed into law SB79, which made Nevada into a right-to-work state. He left office in 1959.

Death
Russell died on September 13, 1989, in Carson City, Nevada, at the age of 85. He is interred at the Dayton Cemetery in Dayton, Nevada.

References

External links
Charles H. Russell Papers. Special Collections, University Libraries, University of Nevada, Reno

 

|-

1903 births
1989 deaths
20th-century American newspaper editors
20th-century American politicians
Editors of Nevada newspapers
Republican Party Nevada state senators
Republican Party governors of Nevada
People from Lovelock, Nevada
Republican Party members of the United States House of Representatives from Nevada
University of Nevada alumni
20th-century American Episcopalians